Trogoderma sternale is a species of carpet beetle in the family Dermestidae. It is found in North America.

Subspecies
These five subspecies belong to the species Trogoderma sternale:
 Trogoderma sternale aspericolle Casey, 1900
 Trogoderma sternale deserti Beal, 1954
 Trogoderma sternale maderae Beal, 1954
 Trogoderma sternale plagifer Casey, 1916
 Trogoderma sternale sternale Jayne, 1882

References

Further reading

 
 

Dermestidae
Articles created by Qbugbot
Beetles described in 1882